The 1992 United States presidential election in Virginia took place on November 3, 1992, as part of the 1992 United States presidential election. Voters chose 13 representatives, or electors to the Electoral College, who voted for president and vice president.

Virginia was won by incumbent President George H. W. Bush (R-Texas) with 44.97 percent of the popular vote over Governor Bill Clinton (D-Arkansas) with 40.59 percent. Businessman Ross Perot (I-Texas) finished in third, with 13.63 percent of the popular vote. Clinton ultimately won the national vote, defeating both incumbent President Bush and Perot. , this is the last election in which the independent cities of Newport News and Emporia voted for a Republican presidential candidate and the last election in which Henry County voted for a Democratic presidential candidate, and it is also the only occasion since 1944 that Virginia and Colorado have not supported the same candidate.

With 44.97 percent of the popular vote, Virginia would prove to be Bush's sixth strongest state in the 1992 election after Mississippi, Utah (as a margin of victory), South Carolina, Alabama and Nebraska. This would also be the last election in which Virginia would vote to the right of Texas and North Carolina.

Results

Results by county

References

Virginia
1992
1992 Virginia elections